The 1590s decade ran from January 1, 1590, to December 31, 1599.

References